Todd Weiler (born 1967) is a Republican member of the Utah State Senate. He lives in Woods Cross, Utah. Weiler was first appointed to the state Senate in January 2012.

Early life, education, and career
Weiler received his business degree from Brigham Young University and continued on there to get his J.D. degree from J. Reuben Clark Law School. Senator Weiler is affiliated with the Utah State Bar, and is associated with the Utah League of Cities and Towns. Weiler is an attorney by profession. Weiler has worked in-house for Logistics Specialties, Inc. He served as vice president of legal and general counsel, where he manages a small business unit and conducts all in-house legal needs.

Weiler has been married to his wife Elizabeth since 1991. They have four children, all of whom are currently enrolled in public school.

Political career
Weiler was appointed to his Senate seat on January 13, 2012, by the Governor. Before his job as Senator, Weiler was a member of Woods Cross City Council. From 1999 to 2011 he served as a delegate on the Rob Bishop for Congress Finance Committee and the Utah GOP State Central Committee. He was also the Davis County Republican Party Chair and the Utah GOP Vice Chair.

Weiler maintains a dismissive view of socialism, communism, and other economic systems that he perceives as threatening to American capitalism. Weiler lobbied to declare pornography a public health crisis, saying, "I'm here to agree with many others who have called pornography a plague." He further lobbied to mandate pornography filters on the internet at large.

In 2015, Weiler voted in favor of the landmark LGBTQ rights bill "Antidiscrimination and Religious Freedom Amendments" which bans discrimination against lesbian, gay, bisexual and transgender people in employment and housing.

In 2016, Weiler was on the following committees: 
Retirement and Independent Entities Appropriations Subcommittee (Senate Chair)
Social Services Appropriations Subcommittee
Senate Business and Labor Committee
Senate Judiciary, Law Enforcement, and Criminal Justice Committee
Senate Retirement and Independent Entities Committee (Chair)
Senate Rules Committee

Election

2012

Legislation

2016 sponsored bills

Notable 2017 sponsored bills

Notable 2018 sponsored bills

Notable legislation  
 In 2014, Weiler also sponsored S.B. 229 Fourth Substitute Adoption Act Amendments, which helps give fathers more rights if a mother is putting the child up for adoption. This bill passed and was signed by the governor. He also ran S.B. 227 Exposure of Children to Pornography, which provides that a district court shall consider, when determining child custody in a separation or divorce, whether the parent has intentionally exposed the child to pornography or material harmful to a child; this bill also passed.
 During the 2016 legislative session Weiler sponsored and passed a joint resolution calling pornography a public health crisis in the state of Utah. He also sponsored a bill that would allow parents to opt their children into a gun safety education course through school. The course teaches students what to do if they come across a gun while at school.
During the 2020 COVID-19 pandemic in Utah, Weiler supported legislation to stockpile the experimental medication hydroxychloroquine. On Twitter the Senator stated that "While the funds could be used for drugs like HCQ, they could be used for other potential treatments as well.” Soon it emerged that Utah had already purchased $800,000 worth of the drug, at vastly inflated prices, from a local pharmacy with connections to Senate President Stuart Adams.

Sources

Living people
1967 births
Republican Party Utah state senators
People from Davis County, Utah
Brigham Young University alumni
21st-century American politicians
Latter Day Saints from Utah